Allan Wu (born  on June 11, 1972) is a Singapore-based Chinese-American actor, host, VJ and former model.

He is perhaps best known for being the host of 3 different editions of the popular reality game show, The Amazing Race. He was the host of 5 seasons of AXN Asia's The Amazing Race Asia, 3 seasons of International Channel Shanghai's The Amazing Race: China Rush and 4 seasons of Shenzhen Media Group's Chinese edition of The Amazing Race.

Wu decided to change his Chinese name because it was similar to Hong Kong film star Francis Ng.

Early life and education
Wu was born in Los Angeles, California, United States to Chinese immigrant parents from Shenyang, Liaoning, China. His first language was Mandarin as his parents spoke it at home. He graduated from the University of California, Berkeley in the United States and worked in the biotechnology industry for several years. He eventually discovered his desire to become an actor after an accident made him reassess his life. He did some modeling for a while and also participated in an episode of the reality competition series Fear Factor, where he placed 2nd. He moved to Hong Kong where he worked as an actor.

Career
Despite struggling with limited knowledge of Cantonese, MTV Taiwan gave him a stint as a VJ, during which he co-hosted a Christmas concert. He moved to Singapore and began acting in Chinese language drama series on Channel 8.

He has been the host for all five seasons of The Amazing Race Asia. He is also the host of The Amazing Race: China Rush, the Chinese version of The Amazing Race. In Season 16 of the American version of The Amazing Race, Allan Wu made a cameo appearance in Singapore, handing out clues.

Personal life
In September 2011, Wu and his family relocated to Shanghai, China to be nearer to job commitments.

Wu was married to former Mediacorp actress Wong Li Lin and they have a daughter Sage and son Jonas. Sage was 1 and a half years older than Jonas, she was born in 2004 while he was born in 2006. The couple is managed by Fly Entertainment. In 2013, the couple separated.

Filmography
Television

Film

Awards

Shows

Brand Ambassador/ Spokesperson

References

External links

Personal Website / Blog
Profile on xinmsn
Profile at Fly Entertainment

1972 births
Living people
Singaporean male television actors
American male actors
Chinese game show hosts
Hong Kong male models
University of California, Berkeley alumni
Singaporean people of Chinese descent
American emigrants to Singapore
Chinese male models
American people of Chinese descent
Participants in American reality television series